Bråten is a tram stop on the Oslo Tramway.

It is located at Bråten in Nordstrand and it was opened on 11 June 1917, as part of the Ekeberg Line to Sæter. There is a balloon loop just after the station. The SL18 trams were tested between Skøyen tram stop and Bråten, in early 2022 as part of Line 13. 

The section between Sørli tram stop and Bråten was upgraded in 2012, and Bråten itself was upgraded in 2013.

References

Oslo Tramway stations in Oslo
Railway stations opened in 1917
1917 establishments in Norway